Count Eric Carl Gabriel Oxenstierna (20 September 1916 - 22 February 1968) was a Swedish historian and archaeologist.

Biography
Eric Carl Gabriel Oxenstierna was born in Stockholm on 20 September 1916. He was the son of prominent vicar Count B. G. Oxenstierna, and Borghild Kamph. Oxenstierna received his elementary education at Nya Elementar in Stockholm. He received his first PhD at the University of Berlin, and then a second PhD at Uppsala University. Oxenstierna subsequently published a number of influential works on archaeology, particularly regarding the Roman Iron Age of Sweden. His academic career was however cut short because of his enthusiasm for Nazi Germany, where he worked and taught during the Second World War. Oxenstierna died in Göttingen, Germany on 22 February 1968.

Personal life
Oxenstierna was married to Edith Drabsch-D'Amara, with whom he had a son Gyrder and a daughter Gabriella. He lived for long periods in Lidingö, Stockholm.

Selected works
 Die Urheimat der Goten. Johann Ambrosius Barth, Leipzig; Hugo Gerbers, Stockholm; 1948.
 Die Goldhörner von Gallehus. Eric Oxenstierna, Lidingo, 1956.
 The Norsemen, New York Graphic Society Publishers, 1956. (Translated and edited by Catherine Hutter)
 Scandinavia. Viking Press, New York, 1963. (Edited by Martin Huerlimann)
 The World of the Norsemen. Weidenfeld & Nicolson, London, 1967. (Translated by Janet Sondheimer)

See also
 Birger Nerman

References

1916 births
1968 deaths
Humboldt University of Berlin alumni
Swedish archaeologists
20th-century Swedish historians
Swedish non-fiction writers
Uppsala University alumni
Eric
20th-century archaeologists
20th-century non-fiction writers